Luís Teixeira or Ludovico Teixeira was a 16th-century Portuguese, cartographer, and mathematician. He had two sons, also cartographers.

He should not be confused with Luís Teixeira Lobo, one of the first Portuguese humanists, son of João Teixeira and brother of Álvaro, who was sent to study in Italy and influenced by the florentine ideals of Angelo Poliziano. Luís Teixeira Lobo was later rector of the University of Siena (1476), Professor of Law at Ferrara (1502) and teacher to the King John III of Portugal.  

Teixeira contributed a well-known early map of Japan (Iaponiae Insulae Descriptio)   to Abraham Ortelius's atlas Theatrum Orbis Terrarum.  It was the first separate map of Japan, and was for many years the standard map of Japan used by Europeans (until the 1655 map by Martino Martini).

An important atlas of the colony of Brazil is attributed to Teixeira, entitled Roteiro de todos os sinais, conhecimentos, fundos, baixos, alturas, e derrotas que há na costa do Brasil desde o Cabo de Santo Agostinho até ao estreito de Fernão de Magalhães (1586).

Portuguese cartographers
16th-century Portuguese Jesuits
16th-century cartographers
Year of birth missing
Year of death missing
16th-century Portuguese mathematicians